The Rock of   (Tahamí: Mojarrá) is a landmark inselberg in Colombia. It is located in the town and municipality of Guatapé, Antioquia.

The landform is a granitic rock remnant that has resisted weathering and erosion, likely as result of being less fractured than the surrounding bedrock. The Peñón de Guatapé is an outcrop of the Antioquia Batholith and towers up to 200 meters (656 feet) above its base. Visitors can scale the rock via a staircase with 708 steps built into one side.

Near the base of the Rock, there are food and market stalls for shopping. About halfway up the stairs, there is a shrine to the Virgin Mary. The summit contains a three-story viewpoint tower, a convenience store, and a seating area.

History 
According to geologists, the rock is approximately 65 million years old. The indigenous Tahamí, former inhabitants of this region, worshiped the rock and called it in their language mojarrá or mujará (meaning 'rock' or 'stone').

The rock was first officially climbed in July 16, 1954, when Luis Eduardo Villegas López, Pedro Nel Ramírez, and Ramón Díaz climbed the rock in a five-day endeavor, using sticks that were fixed against the rock's wall.

A new species of plant, named Pitcairnia heterophylla by a German scientist, was found on the top of the rock.

A viewing spot was built on top of the rock, where it is possible to acquire handicrafts, postcards, and other local goods. It is possible to see the 500 km shore-perimeter dam. There are 708 steps to the uppermost step atop the building at the summit, a fact reinforced by blue numbers also seen in the climb up the stairs.

In the 1940s, the Colombian government declared it a National Monument.

Graffiti

On the western face of the stone there are painted large white letters "G" and an incomplete "U" (only the single vertical stroke was completed, resembling an "I"). The towns of Guatapé and El Peñol had long disputed ownership of the rock, and the residents of Guatapé decided to settle the matter by painting the town's name on the rock in huge white letters. It did not take long for the residents of El Peñol to notice the work, and a large mob was assembled to stop it, leaving behind the unfinished graffiti.

Properties 
The rock rises from the bottom of the hydroelectric dam of Peñon de Guatapé. This monolith was spotted as a border landmark between country farms and the two cities.

It has some breaks, one of which was used to construct the 740 steps of the stairway to the summit.

The Stone of Peñol is composed of quartz, feldspar and granite.

Gallery

See also 

 Sugarloaf Mountain
 Penyal d'Ifac Natural Park
 List of inselbergs

References

External links 
 Guatapé Official City Website

Sacred rocks
Geography of Antioquia Department
Inselbergs of South America
Rock formations of Colombia
Tourist attractions in Antioquia Department
Natural monoliths